Yhdessä (Together) is the fifth studio album by Finnish singer Robin. The all duets album was released on 9 October 2015.

Track listing

Charts

Release history

See also
List of number-one albums of 2016 (Finland)

References

2015 albums
Robin (singer) albums
Vocal duet albums